{{Infobox KHL team
| team   = Microz Limburg Eaters
| colour     = background:#FFFFFF; border-top:#C21531 5px solid; border-bottom:#133960 5px solid;
| colour text= #000000
| logo      = Eaters_Limburg_logo.png
| logosize  = 260px
| nickname   = 
| founded    = 1968
| folded  = 
| city   = Geleen, Netherlands
| arena      = IJshal Glanerbrook
| capacity   = 1200
| league     = BeNe League2015-presentEredivisie1971-2015Dutch Cup| division   = 
| conference = 
| uniform    = 
| colours    = Red, blue, white  
| owner      = 
| gm         = 
| coach = Andy Tenbult
| ass_coach  = Alf Philippen
| ass_coach2 = Erik Tummers
| captain    = Glenn Bakx
| president  = 
| affiliates = 
| website    = Microz Eaters Limburg
| current    = 

| name1       = Intercai Geleen 
| dates1      = 1988 - 1991
| name2       = Meetpoint Eaters Geleen 
| dates2      = 1991 - 1994
| name3       = Hatulek Eaters Geleen  
| dates3      = 1994- 1995
| name4       = Smoke Eaters Geleen 
| dates4      = 1995 - 1996
| name5       = Datak Eaters Geleen 
| dates5      = 1996 - 1997
| name6       = Ruijters Eaters Geleen 
| dates6      = 1999 - 2013
| name7       = Limburg Eaters Geleen| dates7      = 2013 - Present
}}Eaters Limburg (formerly known as the Geleen Smoke Eaters) are a professional ice hockey team based in Geleen, The Netherlands. They play in the BeNe League, the highest-level hockey league in the Netherlands and Belgium.  Home games are played at the Glanerbrook.

History

The Geleen Smoke Eaters, named after the Trail Smoke Eaters, played their first game against Amsterdam on November 2, 1968.  They first competed in the Eredivisie in 1971 and have participated in most of its seasons. Since 2015 the team have played in the BeNe League, and have been sponsored by food supplement company Microz

Season resultsNote:''' GP = Games played, W = Wins, OTW = Overtime Wins, OTL = Overtime Losses, L = Losses, GF = Goals for, GA = Goals against, Pts = Points

Roster 
Updated February 28, 2019.

Championships

 Eredivisie National Championship

One (2011–2012)

 Netherlands Cup Winners

Twice. (1992–1993);(2009–2010)

Former players
 Nathan Daly
 Benjamin Finkenrath
 David Coderre

References

External links
 Geleen Eaters official website (Dutch)
 Netherlands Ice Hockey Union (Dutch)
 Ijshockey.com information on the Eredivisie teams (Dutch)

BeNe League (ice hockey) teams
Ice hockey teams in the Netherlands
Ice hockey clubs established in 1968
Sports clubs in Sittard-Geleen